Andrej Kramarić (born 19 June 1991) is a Croatian professional footballer who plays as a forward or attacking midfielder for Bundesliga club 1899 Hoffenheim and the Croatia national team.

Kramarić started his football career in his hometown club Dinamo Zagreb and holds the record as the top youth goalscorer in the club's history. Hailed as one of the club's biggest talents, he made his first official appearance for Dinamo at the age of 17. In 2013, after he had a dispute with the Dinamo board of directors, Kramarić was transferred to HNK Rijeka, where he scored 37 times in 42 league games prior to his move to Leicester City for a record £9 million. He played a year-and-a-half there, spending time on loan at 1899 Hoffenheim before moving there permanently. On 29 March 2019, he became the club's all-time top goalscorer. On 24 January 2021, he became Bundesliga all-time top Croatian goalscorer.

Kramarić was capped 53 times at various youth levels for Croatia, scoring 22 goals in total. He took part at the 2010 UEFA European Under-19 Football Championship, making four appearances for a Croatian team that reached the tournament semi-finals. He made his debut for the senior team in 2014, and later took part at the UEFA European Championship in 2016 and 2020 and the FIFA World Cup in 2018 and 2022, helping Croatia to reach the final of the 2018 tournament.

Club career

Dinamo Zagreb

Kramarić joined Dinamo Zagreb when he was just six years old. During his youth career, he scored over 450 goals for Dinamo youth teams, making him the top youth scorer in club history.

Kramarić made his debut for the Dinamo senior squad on 24 May 2009 in a league match against Zagreb. He made an appearance as a 69th-minute substitute for Josip Tadić. It was also his only match for the Dinamo first-team during the 2008–09 season.

Kramarić was promoted to the first-team squad the following season. He made his first appearance of the season and also debuted in the UEFA Champions League on 15 July in an away match against Pyunik, which finished in a goalless draw. Later that year, Kramarić won his first league title with Dinamo, scoring seven goals in 24 appearances en route. He also made five appearances in the 2009–10 Croatian Cup and scored four goals, and made five appearances in UEFA competitions. The following season turned out to be disappointing for Kramarić, however. With the arrival of new coach Vahid Halilhodžić, Kramarić was mostly used as a late substitute, rarely being used as a match starter. He managed to collect less than 600 minutes of playing time in 17 appearances he made throughout the 2010–11 season, scoring five goals in process. Despite the personal struggle, he won the league and cup double with his team.

In the first half of the 2011–12 season, Kramarić's status in the club did not change, as he collected only three appearances before the winter break, and the speculations about him leaving the club started to rise. In February 2012, it was announced that Kramarić would be loaned to Prva HNL team Lokomotiva.

Lokomotiva Zagreb
In February 2012, Kramarić was loaned to Lokomotiva until the end of the season. At Lokomotiva, he became one of the most proficient strikers in Southeast Europe, scoring 20 goals in 44 league appearances in the season-and-a-half he spent with the Lokosi. In his first full season with Lokomotiva, he finished runner-up to Leon Benko in the Prva HNL top goalscorer race with 15 goals. He also helped his team reach the Croatian Cup final in where they were defeated by Hajduk Split.

Return to Dinamo Zagreb
There was great excitement when Kramarić returned to Dinamo Zagreb at the start of the 2013–14 season, with many pundits predicting that he would become the ruthless striker Dinamo had been lacking in recent years. He started his returning season coming on as a late substitute in a Croatian Supercup match where Dinamo secured their first trophy of the season by defeating Hajduk Split on penalties. But things for Kramarić did not go very well, as he found himself once again on the bench. He quickly became discouraged and complained to the press about his lack of playing time. This did not bode well with club director Zoran Mamić, who decided to put the young star on the transfer list.

Rijeka
Rijeka were the quickest to react to the falling out between Kramarić and Dinamo, securing his services on 31 August 2013. Kramarić debuted for the team on 15 September, playing in the starting line-up in a Prva HNL league match against Slaven Belupo, in which he also scored his first goal for the team in the 15th minute, the match's only goal. During a Croatian Cup match, Kramarić scored eight goals against BŠK Zmaj. In November 2013, he scored an astonishing goal against Lyon in the Europa League group stage. He scored his first hat-trick of the season against Istra 1961 in a match that ended 3–3, with Kramarić also missing a penalty. He then netted another goal against Rijeka's arch rivals Hajduk Split at the Stadion Poljud. Kramarić finished his first season with Rijeka by winning the Croatian Cup, and scoring 27 goals in all competitions.
In July 2014, just before the start of the new season, Kramarić won the Croatian Supercup when Rijeka defeated his former club and reigning champions Dinamo Zagreb.

Kramarić opened the new season of the Prva HNL by scoring five goals in the opening two matches, including a hat-trick against Hajduk Split. By the end of October 2014, he had already scored more than 20 goals in all competitions, including a hat-trick in a Europa League match against Feyenoord. On 9 November, Kramarić scored five goals against Lokomotiva in a home match that ended 6–0, a feat that was entered into league annals—for 14 years, no player had scored more than four goals in one match, and in history only two other players have managed to score that number.

Leicester City

On 8 January 2015, Premier League club Leicester City announced that they had agreed a deal to sign Kramarić on a three-and-a-half-year contract, confirming an earlier announcement by Rijeka. The transfer, however, was dependent on Kramarić being awarded a work permit on appeal, as he did not meet the requirements for one to be automatically granted. Four days after Leicester's announcement, an FA Panel recommended the approval of work permit, clearing the way for Leicester to apply to the UK Border Agency.

On 16 January, Leicester announced Kramarić had officially joined the club after being granted a UK work permit and that he would wear the number 40. His transfer fee was £9 million, a club record for Leicester. He made his debut the day after signing, replacing striker Jamie Vardy for the last 25 minutes of a 0–1 home defeat against Stoke City. On 10 February, Kramarić scored his first goal for the club in 2–1 away defeat against Arsenal.

Kramarić failed to establish a spot in the starting XI for the early stages of the 2015–16 season. He played only two league games when Leicester became Premier League champions, making him ineligible for a winner's medal (minimum five league games required).

1899 Hoffenheim
On 20 January 2016, Kramarić was loaned to Bundesliga club 1899 Hoffenheim. He made his debut against Bayern Munich on 31 January, then scored his first goal in a draw with Werder Bremen, where he also was sent off in the 77th minute for accumulating two yellow cards. On 30 April he missed a penalty against Ingolstadt 04, however Hoffenheim won 2–1. On 14 MAR 2023, Kramarić signed for 1899 Hoffenheim on a four-year deal for an undisclosed fee.

In his debut season, he was Hoffenheim's 2016–17 season top-scorer with 18 goals (15 league goals). On 4 April, Kramarić scored a 21st-minute goal to give Hoffenheim the lead against German champions Bayern Munich, a game which Hoffenheim won 1–0. Kramarić was considered one of Hoffenheim's key players in their 2016–17 campaign in which they finished fourth, alongside Niklas Süle, Sandro Wagner, Ádám Szalai, and Sebastian Rudy.

On 23 October 2018, Kramarić scored a brace in a 3–3 draw against Lyon in the 2018–19 UEFA Champions League, then he managed to score a goal in each match of the return legs, against Lyon, Shakhtar Donetsk and Manchester City.

On 29 March 2019, after scoring his forty-seventh goal for Hoffenheim in a 4–1 league victory over Bayer Leverkusen, Kramarić became the club's all-time Bundesliga top goalscorer, surpassing Sejad Salihović who scored 46. On 28 April, he missed a penalty against VfL Wolfsburg at result 1–0 for Hoffenheim and Wolfsburg turned the match over into a 4–1 victory, which left Hoffenheim four points behind fourth position, the last one which gives a chance to compete in the Champions League. It was his second league penalty miss for Hoffenheim, and third in total.

On 20 June 2020, Kramarić scored in a 4–0 victory over Union Berlin. On the last matchday, 27 June, he scored all four goals in a 4–0 away win against second-placed Borussia Dortmund, becoming the first Hoffenheim player to do so in a Bundesliga match. He also became the first player to score four against Dortmund away in a single game, surpassing Fritz Walter, Erhard Hofeditz and Gerd Müller who had managed to score three. The victory also secured Hoffenheim's sixth place league finish and qualification for the Europa League group stage.

On 13 September, Kramarić scored both goals in a DFB-Pokal 2–2 draw with Chemnitzer FC, and successfully converted a penalty in a shootout as Hoffenheim won 3–2. On 19 September, in Hoffenheim's first league game of the season, Kramarić scored a hat-trick in the 3–2 victory over Köln. That meant he scored nine goals in three consecutive games for the club, being the club's only goalscorer in all three of them. At the same time, he broke Mario Gómez's record of goals scored in consecutive 1. Bundesliga and 2. Bundesliga matches (7), scoring eight in four consecutive league games. On 27 September, he scored a brace in a 4–1 victory over German and European champions Bayern Munich, ending their 32-game unbeaten streak and 23-game winning streak in all competitions and inflicting the first defeat of the calendar year on them. On 16 October, he was named the Bundesliga Player of the Month. The same day, it was announced that he tested positive for COVID-19. On 24 January 2021, he surpassed Ivica Olić and became Bundesliga all-time top Croatian goalscorer after scoring a brace in a 3–0 victory over Köln and reaching the number of 74 goals. On 15 May, in a 1–1 draw with Arminia Bielefeld, he scored his 19th goal of the season, a record for a Hoffenheim player, surpassing Vedad Ibišević who scored 18 in the 2008–09 season.

International career

Youth
Kramarić was capped a total of 53 times for various Croatian youth teams and scored 22 goals in return. His first national team appearance came against Bavaria national team on 31 March 2005. He was then playing for the under-14 team and was capped a total of two times. Kramarić then started competing at the under-16 and under-17 levels. He made a total of seven appearances in friendly matches for the under-16 team and scored four goals. For the under-17 team, he was capped 12 times and scored six goals. He also participated in all of under–17 team's qualifiers for the 2008 European U–17 Championship. At the under-18 level, Kramarić was capped nine times and scored three goals.

In 2008, he started playing for the under-19 team, with whom he reached he semi-finals of the 2010 UEFA European Under-19 Football Championship. He debuted and scored his first goal at under-21 level on 5 September 2009 in a European Championship qualifier against Norway, aged just 18 years and 81 days.

Senior
On 20 August 2014, Kramarić received his first call-up for the senior team under coach Niko Kovač for the friendly match against Cyprus and UEFA Euro 2016 qualifying match against Malta. He made his debut for Croatia on 4 September 2014 in a friendly match against Cyprus and provided an assist for Mario Mandžukić in 18th minute, receiving positive reviews from both critics and national team coach for his debut performance. Kramarić scored his first goal for Croatia in his competitive debut in the qualifying match against Malta. His second goal was scored against Azerbaijan on 13 October 2014.

On 9 October 2017, he scored two goals in a crucial 2018 FIFA World Cup qualifier against Ukraine, securing Croatia's qualification to playoffs. On 4 June 2018, Kramarić was included in Croatia's final World Cup squad. On 7 July, in the 2018 FIFA World Cup quarter-final match against hosts Russia, he scored Croatia's equaliser in the first half of regulation time. A 1–1 draw after 90 minutes saw the match go into extra-time, and following a 2–2 draw after 120 minutes of play, Croatia once again progressed to the next round in the ensuing shoot-out, winning 4–3 on penalties.

Style of play
Kramarić has been described as versatile striker who is mobile enough to run behind defences and rather than waiting for crosses or ball to come to him, tends to run towards the ball, engulfing his opposition with an air of unpredictability about his play. Although naturally a lone striker, his versatility makes him able to play well as a winger or second striker. His former national team coach Niko Kovač compared him with legendary Croatian striker Davor Šuker. In May 2021, his former Hoffenheim coach Julian Nagelsmann named him the best player he had ever worked with.

Personal life
On 31 March 2021, Kramarić married Mia Ćurković in a private ceremony at the Old City Hall in Zagreb Upper Town. In late August 2021, they became the parents of a son they named Viktor.

Career statistics

Club

International

Croatia's score listed first, score column indicates score after each Kramarić goal.

Honours
Dinamo Zagreb
Prva HNL: 2009–10, 2010–11
Croatian Cup: 2010–11
Croatian Super Cup: 2013

Rijeka
Croatian Cup: 2013–14
Croatian Super Cup: 2014

Croatia
FIFA World Cup runner-up: 2018; third place: 2022

Individual
Prva HNL Player of the Year: 2014
Football Oscar Team of the Year: 2013, 2014
Ivica Jobo Kurtini Award: 2014
Prva HNL Top goalscorer: 2014–15
Croatian Cup Top goalscorer: 2013–14
Hoffenheim Player of the Season: 2016–17
Bundesliga Player of the Month: September 2020

Orders
Order of Duke Branimir: 2018

References

External links

 

1991 births
Living people
Footballers from Zagreb
Association football forwards
Croatian footballers
Croatia youth international footballers
Croatia under-21 international footballers
Croatia international footballers
UEFA Euro 2016 players
2018 FIFA World Cup players
UEFA Euro 2020 players
2022 FIFA World Cup players
GNK Dinamo Zagreb players
NK Lokomotiva Zagreb players
HNK Rijeka players
Leicester City F.C. players
TSG 1899 Hoffenheim players
Croatian Football League players
Premier League players
Bundesliga players
Croatian expatriate footballers
Expatriate footballers in England
Croatian expatriate sportspeople in England
Expatriate footballers in Germany
Croatian expatriate sportspeople in Germany